Turbonilla singularis is a species of sea snail, a marine gastropod mollusk in the family Pyramidellidae.

Description
The length of the shell attains 3.6 mm.

Distribution
This marine species occurs in the Pacific Ocean off the Fiji Islands.

References

 Peñas A. & Rolán E. (2010) Deep water Pyramidelloidea of the tropical South Pacific: Turbonilla and related genera. In: Gofas S. (ed.) Tropical Deep Sea Benthos 26. Mémoires du Muséum National d'Histoire Naturelle 200: 1-436

External links
 To Encyclopedia of Life
 To World Register of Marine Species

singularis
Gastropods described in 2010